Estadio Manuel Mesones Muro is a multi-use stadium in Bagua, Peru. It is currently used mostly for football matches and is the home stadium of Club San Francisco de Asís of the Copa Perú. The stadium holds 6,000 spectators. 

Manuel Mesones Muro
Buildings and structures in Amazonas Region